Oliva sericea is a species of sea snail, a marine gastropod mollusk in the family Olividae, the olives.

Description
The length of the shell varies between 55 mm and 112 mm.

Distribution

References

 Marrat, F.P. (1868). On some new species of Oliva. Annals and Magazine of Natural History. Series 4, 2: 212–214.

External links
 Duclos, P. L. (1835-1840). Histoire naturelle générale et particulière de tous les genres de coquilles univalves marines a l'état vivant et fossile publiée par monographie. Genre Olive. Paris: Institut de France. 33 plates: pls 1-12
 MNHN, Paris: syntype

sericea
Gastropods described in 1798